The 2009 Mid-American Conference men's basketball tournament is the post-season basketball tournament for the Mid-American Conference (MAC) 2008–2009 season.  The winner of the tournament receives the MAC's automatic bid into the NCAA Men's Division I Basketball Championship tournament. Fifth-seeded Akron defeated Buffalo in the final.  In the NCAA tournament they lost in the first round to Gonzaga.

Format
Each of the 12 men's basketball teams in the MAC receives a berth in the conference tournament.  Teams are seeded by conference record with the following tie-breakers:
 Head-to-head competition
 Winning percentage vs. ranked conference teams (top to bottom, regardless of division, vs. common opponents regardless of the number of times played)
 Coin flip

The top four seeds receive byes into the quarterfinals.  The winners of each division are awarded the #1 and #2 seeds.  The team with the best record of the two receives the #1 seed.

Bracket

* Overtime

Tiebreakers

Seeds

West Division

All-Tournament Team
Tournament MVP – Nate Linhart, Akron

References

Tournament
MAC men's basketball tournament
MAC men's basketball tournament
Mid-American Conference men's basketball tournament
Basketball in Cleveland